The flag of the city of Baltimore features the "Battle Monument", which is also the central motif on the city's seal.

The monument was constructed in the former colonial era Courthouse Square along North Calvert Street, between East Lexington Street to the north and East Fayette Street to the south, after the second Baltimore City and County Courthouse was constructed on a site farther west across Calvert Street in 1805.

Commemorating the soldiers and officers that fell in the defense of the city against the British land and sea attack in the Battle of Baltimore with the Battle of North Point and subsequent Bombardment of Fort McHenry on September 12-13-14th, 1814, during the War of 1812.

The memorial was begun with a cornerstone laying one year after the attack on September 12, 1815, (later observed annually as Defenders Day, a city/county/state legal holiday) and completed in 1822, seven years later.

The design was by French emigre architect Maximilian Godefroy and five years later was placed as the central figure  with the city incorporation date of 1797 underneath on the city's newly designed oval official seal in 1827.

In the 20th century, the monument was also placed over the black and gold  colors design from the Calvert family quarters from the shield of the Great Seal of the State of Maryland, in the city flag now flown along with the American  and Maryland state flags at all public buildings and many private sites.

The field is in the Calvert family colors of black and yellow / gold (sometimes orange) and design, which also appear in the first and fourth quarters of the Maryland state flag taken from the shield of the Calvert-Crossland families coats-of-arms.

The flag is blazoned (described in heraldic) terms as follows: Paly of six Or and sable, a bend counterchanged, on an inescutcheon Sable, within an orle of the first, a representation of Baltimore's Battle Monument Argent.  Two other designs were submitted for consideration; both included the Battle Monument and the Calvert arms.

Respondents to a 2004 survey sponsored by the North American Vexillological Association rated the Baltimore city flag 7.46 on a 10-point scale, making it the 18th best American city flag in the 150 flag survey of American cities.

See also
 Seal of Baltimore

References

External links
 

Flag
Flag
Flags of Maryland
History of Baltimore
Flags introduced in 1915